Vysočany may refer to:

Vysočany, a part of Prague (9th district)
Vysočany (Blansko District), in the east of the Czech Republic
Vysočany (Znojmo District), in the south of the Czech Republic
Vysočany (Hrušovany), in the northwest of the Czech Republic
Vysočany (Bánovce nad Bebravou District), Slovakia